Sergei A Mezheninov (January 19, 1890 – September 28, 1937) was a Soviet komkor (corps commander). 

He fought for the Imperial Russian Army during World War I before going over to the Bolsheviks during the subsequent civil war. 
During this war, he commanded the 3rd, 12th and 15th Red Army.

At the time of the Great Purge, Mezheninov was arrested after a suicide attempt on June 20, 1937. He was accused of spying for Nazi Germany, convicted and later executed.

Awards
Russian Empire:
Order of Saint Vladimir, 4th class
Order of Saint Anna, 4th class
Order of Saint Anna, 3rd class
Soviet Union:
Order of the Red Banner (1922)
Order of the Red Star

References

1890 births
1937 deaths
Russian military personnel of World War I
Soviet military personnel of the Russian Civil War
Mezheninov
Recipients of the Order of St. Vladimir, 4th class
Recipients of the Order of St. Anna, 4th class
Recipients of the Order of St. Anna, 3rd class
Recipients of the Order of the Red Banner
Great Purge victims from Russia
People executed by the Soviet Union